Roannais Agglomération is the communauté d'agglomération, an intercommunal structure, centred on the city of Roanne. It is located in the Loire department, in the Auvergne-Rhône-Alpes region, east-central France. It was created in January 2013 by the merger of the former Communauté d'agglomération Grand Roanne Agglomération with 4 former communautés de communes and 1 other commune. Its seat is in Roanne. Its area is 689.3 km2. Its population was 100,486 in 2017, of which 34,366 in Roanne proper.

Composition
The communauté d'agglomération consists of the following 40 communes:

Ambierle
Arcon
Changy
Combre
Commelle-Vernay
Le Coteau
Coutouvre
Le Crozet
Lentigny
Les Noës
Mably
Montagny
Noailly
Notre-Dame-de-Boisset
Ouches
La Pacaudière
Parigny
Perreux
Pouilly-les-Nonains
Renaison
Riorges
Roanne
Sail-les-Bains
Saint-Alban-les-Eaux
Saint-André-d'Apchon
Saint-Bonnet-des-Quarts
Saint-Forgeux-Lespinasse
Saint-Germain-Lespinasse
Saint-Haon-le-Châtel
Saint-Haon-le-Vieux
Saint-Jean-Saint-Maurice-sur-Loire
Saint-Léger-sur-Roanne
Saint-Martin-d'Estréaux
Saint-Rirand
Saint-Romain-la-Motte
Saint-Vincent-de-Boisset
Urbise
Villemontais
Villerest
Vivans

References

Agglomeration communities in France
Intercommunalities of Loire